The Varuna Express 14227 / 28 Varanasi–Lucknow is an Express train belonging to Indian Railways – Northern Railway zone that runs between  & Lucknow NR in India.

It operates as train number 14227 from Varanasi Junction to Lucknow NR and as train number 14228 in the reverse direction, serving the state of Uttar Pradesh.

It is named after the Lord of Water–Varuna is one of three trains that run between Varanasi Junction and Lucknow NR, the others being 14219/20 Varanasi–Lucknow Express & 14203 / 04 Varanasi–Lucknow Intercity Express.

Coaches
The 14227 / 28 Varanasi–Lucknow Varuna Express has 1 AC Chair Car, 14 General Unreserved & 2 SLR (Seating cum Luggage Rake) coaches. It does not carry a pantry car.
 
As is customary with most train services in India, coach composition may be amended at the discretion of Indian Railways depending on demand.

Service

Routing
The 14227 / 28 Varanasi–Lucknow Varuna Express runs from Varanasi Junction via Jaunpur City railway station, Sultanpur, Haidergarh to Lucknow NR.

Traction
As the route is fully electrified, it is hauled by a Kanpur-based WAP-7 for its entire journey.

Operation
14227 / 28 Varanasi–Lucknow Varuna Express runs on Monday & Thursday in both directions.

References

External links

 Jagran.com
 News.webindia123.com

Passenger trains originating from Varanasi
Passenger trains originating from Lucknow
Named passenger trains of India
Express trains in India